AirTran JetConnect was the brand for AirTran Airways former regional airline service, which flew regional jet aircraft from AirTran's hub in Atlanta. Service was to short-haul markets where AirTran felt their Boeing 717 or Airbus A320 (with the latter type being operated by Ryan International for AirTran via contract) mainline jet aircraft were too large to economically operate.

The JetConnect service was provided by regional carrier Air Wisconsin, which operated ten Canadair Regional Jet (CRJ) twin jets painted in full banner carrier AirTran livery with the subtle title branding Jet Connect added next to the AirTran Livery.

The last regional jet flight operated in August 2004.

History
The agreement was officially announced on September 26, 2002, with service beginning on November 15, 2002.  Initially, JetConnect flew to Greensboro, Pensacola, and Savannah, later expanding to a total of 18 cities across the eastern United States.

On March 5, 2004, AirTran announced that it would be ending its JetConnect service. The airline performed an economic analysis and determined it could operate the Boeing 717 more efficiently than the Canadair regional jets in short-haul markets.  
During the phasing-out process, Air Wisconsin returned all of its regional jets to the United Express fleet, repainting them in United Express livery. All aircraft were subsequently repainted in US Airways colors as Air Wisconsin then began operating entirely under the US Airways Express banner. US Airways then merged with American Airlines which resulted in Air Wisconsin currently operating as an American Eagle regional air carrier.

AirTran would again launch regional service from its then-hub in Milwaukee in December 2009 operated by SkyWest Airlines, but was not branded in the same way as the earlier service. Aircraft retained a generic SkyWest livery, and the operation was discontinued in September 2011.

Destinations

United States
Florida
Jacksonville (Jacksonville International Airport)
Miami (Miami International Airport)
Pensacola (Pensacola Regional Airport)
Tallahassee (Tallahassee Regional Airport)
Tampa Bay Area (Tampa International Airport)
Georgia
Atlanta (Hartsfield-Jackson Atlanta International Airport) Hub
Savannah (Savannah/Hilton Head International Airport)
Illinois
Bloomington/Normal (Central Illinois Regional Airport)
Moline/Rock Island/Bettendorf, Iowa/Davenport, Iowa (Quad City International Airport)
Kansas
Wichita (Mid-Continent Airport)
Maryland
Baltimore (Baltimore-Washington International Thurgood Marshall Airport)
Missouri
Kansas City (Kansas City International Airport)
New York
Rochester (Greater Rochester International Airport)
North Carolina
Greensboro/High Point/Winston-Salem (Piedmont Triad International Airport)
Raleigh  (Raleigh-Durham International Airport)
Ohio
Dayton (Dayton International Airport)
South Carolina
Myrtle Beach (Myrtle Beach International Airport)
Wisconsin
Milwaukee (General Mitchell International Airport)

See also 
 List of defunct airlines of the United States

References

Airlines established in 2002
Airlines disestablished in 2004
AirTran Airways
Defunct regional airline brands
Defunct regional airlines of the United States
2002 establishments in Wisconsin
Airlines based in Wisconsin
Airlines based in Georgia (U.S. state)
Defunct airlines of the United States